is a neighborhood located in the western portion of Tokyo Metropolis, Japan. , the neighborhood had an estimated population of 57,174, and a population density of 5770 persons per km².

Geography
Hamura is approximately in the west-center of Tokyo Metropolis, on the Musashino Terrace. It flanks the Tama River about  upriver from the mouth.

Hamura is composed of the following neighborhoods: Fujimidaira, Futabacho, Gonokami, Hane, Hanehigashi, Kawasaki, Midorigaoka, Ozakudai, Shinmeidai, Tamagawa, Yokotakichinai.

Surrounding municipalities
Tokyo Metropolis
Ōme
Akiruno
Fussa
Mizuho

Climate
Hamura has a Humid subtropical climate (Köppen Cfa) characterized by warm summers and cool winters with light to no snowfall.  The average annual temperature in Hamura is 13.4 °C. The average annual rainfall is 1998 mm with September as the wettest month. The temperatures are highest on average in August, at around 25.0 °C, and lowest in January, at around 1.7 °C.

Demographics
Per Japanese census data, the population of Hamura increased rapidly in the 1960s and 1970s, but has remained relatively constant for the past 40 years.

History
The area of present-day Hamura has been inhabited since Japanese Paleolithic times, and numerous remains from the Jōmon, Yayoi and Kofun periods have been discovered. During the Nara period, it became part of ancient Musashi Province. The Tamagawa Josui, an artificial waterway completed in 1653 to divert water from the Tama River and carry it as drinking water to Edo, begins in what is now part of Hamura.

In the post-Meiji Restoration cadastral reform of April 1, 1889, several hamlets (one of which was named Hane-mura) merged to form Nishitama Village in Nishitama District, at that time part of Kanagawa Prefecture. The entire district was transferred to the control of Tokyo Prefecture on April 1, 1893. In 1956, Nishitama Village became the town of Hamura. On November 1, 1991, Hamura was elevated to city status.

Government
Hamura has a mayor-council form of government with a directly elected mayor and a unicameral city council of 18 members. Hamura, collectively with Fussa, Akiruno, Mizuho, Hinode, Hinohara, and Okutama contributes two members to the Tokyo Metropolitan Assembly. In terms of national politics, the city is part of Tokyo 25th district of the lower house of the Diet of Japan.

Economy
Hamura is primary a regional commercial center, and a bedroom community for central Tokyo and neighbouring Ōme. Several electronic companies have light industrial or logistical facilities in Hamura. Hino Motors and Toyota have a plant and test track in the city.

Education
Hamura has seven public elementary schools and three public middle schools operated by the city government. The city has one high school operated by the Tokyo Metropolitan Government Board of Education. There is also one special education school for the handicapped.

Public junior high schools:

 Hamura No. 1 (羽村第一中学校)
 Hamura No. 2 (羽村第二中学校)
 Hamura No. 3 (羽村第三中学校)

Public elementary schools:

 Fujimi (富士見小学校)
 Hamura Higashi (羽村東小学校)
 Hamura Nishi (羽村西小学校)
 Musashino (武蔵野小学校)
 Ozakudai (小作台小学校)
 Sakae (栄小学校)
 Shorin (松林小学校)

The United States Department of Defense Education Activity (DoDEA) operates the following schools on Yokota Air Base and in the municipality of Hamura for children of United States military personnel:
 Yokota West Elementary School

For secondary levels, U.S. military-dependent children are directed to Yokota Middle School and Yokota High School, both on base, but in Fussa instead of Hamura.

Transportation

Railway
 JR East – Ōme Line
  -

Highway

Local attractions
Hamura Diversion Weir
Aso Shrine
Hamura Zoo

Notable people from Hamura 

Shinji Jojo, professional soccer player
Yuzo Kobayashi, professional soccer player
Shizuka Kudo, actress, singer
Hiroomi Tosaka, singer and actor

References

External links

Hamura City Official Website 

 
Cities in Tokyo
Western Tokyo